Chap may refer to:

Chap (instrument), a Southeast Asian percussion instrument
Chap Petersen (born 1968), American politician and Virginia state senator
Chap, Virginia, United States, an unincorporated community
The Chap, a British magazine
The Chap (band), an experimental pop band from North London
Chap, a caste in the Bhakkar district of the Punjab, Pakistan

CHAP may stand for:
 Challenge-Handshake Authentication Protocol, a computer networking authentication system
 Combined Heat And Power, cogeneration, the use of a heat engine or a power station to simultaneously generate both electricity and useful heat
 Comprehensive Health Assessment Program, a tool used for keeping medical histories of people with intellectual disabilities
 Community Health Accreditation Program, an independent, US not-for-profit accrediting body for health care organizations
 CHAP-FM, a rebroadcaster of CHYC-FM in Chapleau, Ontario, Canada
 CHAP (AM), a 1970s radio station in Longlac, Ontario, Canada

See also
CHAP domain, in molecular biology a region of amino acids found in proteins
Chap boot, a type of footwear
Chap Chap, a village in Iran
Chaps (disambiguation)
Chappe (disambiguation)